Feedback Is Payback is the debut album from 1208 . It was released in February, 2002 on Epitaph Records and was followed by Turn of the Screw in 2004. The album was co-produced by Fletcher Dragge of fellow punk band, Pennywise.

Track listing
All songs written by 1208
"1988"	–	3:28
"Lies That Lie"	–	2:33
"Just Anyone"	–	2:46
"Outside Looking In"	–	2:46
"Scared Away"	–	3:08
"Erase 'em All"	–	2:45
"Pick Your Poison"	–	3:18
"Jimmy"	–	2:54
"Lightshow"	–	2:22
"Retire"	–	2:22
"Slowburn"	–	3:14
"What I Saw"	–	2:40
"Speak Easy"	–	2:29
"Obstructure"	–	2:51

Credits
 Alex – vocals, guitar
 Neshawn – guitar
 Bryan – bass
 Manny – drums
 Recorded at Stall #2, Redondo Beach, California, USA
 Produced and mixed by Darian Rundall and Fletcher Dragge
 Engineered by Darian Rundall
 Mastered by Gene Grimaldi at Oasis Mastering

References

External links
Epitaph Records album page
Epitaph Records band page

2002 debut albums
1208 (band) albums
Epitaph Records albums